Eden International School is a school near the Katvi village in Pune, Maharashtra, India, founded by Justus Devadhas, who has worked at the school for 40 years, and sponsored by the Eden Education Society. The academic system used for primary and nursery children here is Montessori which believes in self-directed activity, hands-on learning and collaborative play.

Introduction 
Eden international school is located in the historic town of Talegaon Dabhade. The school is an Indian unaided, private school for students between Nursery to 12th grade. The school is affiliated to the Indian Certificate of Secondary Education board. Cognitive development of the students is of utmost importance. Emphasis is laid on overall development of the student. Many activities like Annual Science Exhibition, Educational Tours, Interschool and Interhouse competitions, Annual Sports Meet, Music and choir etc. are conducted for and by the students.

References

Montessori schools in India
Primary schools in India
International schools in India
High schools and secondary schools in Maharashtra
Schools in Pune district